I Give You My Word is the fifth studio album by American rapper San Quinn.  The album features production from Tone Capone, One Drop Scott, Cozmo, and Icey Mike Beats, as well as appearances from E-40, Keak da Sneak, and Juvenile.

Track listing

2004 albums
Albums produced by Cozmo
San Quinn albums